Emre Aslan is a Turkish badminton player. He won the silver medal at the 2013 Mediterranean Games in the men's doubles event partnered with Hüseyin Oruç. In 2012, he and Oruç also won the men's doubles title at the Iraq International tournament.

Achievements

Mediterranean Games 
Men's doubles

BWF International Challenge/Series 
Men's doubles

  BWF International Challenge tournament
  BWF International Series tournament
  BWF Future Series tournament

References

External links 
 

Living people
Year of birth missing (living people)
Place of birth missing (living people)
Turkish male badminton players
Mediterranean Games silver medalists for Turkey
Competitors at the 2013 Mediterranean Games
Mediterranean Games medalists in badminton
21st-century Turkish people